The 1990 Nabisco Dinah Shore was a women's professional golf tournament, held March 29 to April 1 at Mission Hills Country Club in Rancho Mirage, California. This was the 19th edition of the Nabisco Dinah Shore, and the eighth as a major championship.

Betsy King won the second of her three Dinah Shores, two strokes ahead of runners-up Shirley Furlong and Kathy Postlewait. She began the final round with a five-shot lead, then carded a 75 (+3), with four bogeys on the last seven holes. It was the third of King's six major titles; she was the reigning U.S. Women's Open champion and repeated in July.

Past champions in the field

Made the cut

Missed the cut

Final leaderboard
Sunday, April 1, 1990

References

External links
Golf Observer leaderboard

Chevron Championship
Golf in California
Nabisco Dinah Shore
Nabisco Dinah Shore
Nabisco Dinah Shore
Nabisco Dinah Shore
Nabisco Dinah Shore
Women's sports in California